Vooruit is a historic complex in Ghent, Belgium. Vooruit was originally the festival and art center of the Ghent-based labor movement, with a ballroom, cinema, theater, etc. It is now mainly used for concerts and other cultural events.

History
Vooruit was designed by Ferdinand Dierkens and built between 1911 and 1914 and became a symbol of the socialist movement in the interwar period. The building is named after the socialist consumer organization (or cooperative) Vooruit ("Forward") (1891-1970), supported by Edward Anseele, to protect workers against the instability of capitalism. There workers could eat, drink and enjoy culture at affordable costs.

As a festival and art center, Vooruit was part of the compartmentalized Flemish society until World War II. After the Second World War the building deteriorated until the re-launch in 1982 in its present form as a cultural center. In 1983 Vooruit was recognized as a listed monument. The building continued operating during the restoration process, from 1990 to 2000. In 2000, a fully restored Vooruit was awarded the Flemish Monument of the year Prize.

Presently the rooms are used for parties and concerts, but also for cultural events or debates.

See also
The Maison du Peuple - a similar building in Brussels built by Victor Horta for the Belgian Workers' Party and demolished in 1965.

References

Citations

External links
Official website

Concert halls in Belgium
Buildings and structures in Ghent
Event venues established in 1914
Culture of Ghent
Tourist attractions in East Flanders
Socialism in Belgium
Art Nouveau architecture in Belgium
Art Nouveau theatres
Tourist attractions in Ghent